Havange is a commune in the Moselle department in Grand Est in north-eastern France.

Havange is located between the communes of Tressange in the North, Rochonvillers in the Northeast, Angevillers in the East, Fontoy in the South and Boulange in the West. The village isn't really special compared to its neighbors. The village is located close to the Maginot Line, in which one of the casemates of the Ouvrage Aumetz is located in Havange. 
Despite being in the countryside, the village is very well linked to the bigger cities farther away as it is connected to the A30 autoroute to go to Metz, Southwestern Luxembourg or Belgium and to the D14 Dual carriageway to go to Thionville or Luxembourg (via the A31 autoroute), where most of the people work, go shopping or travel to farther places by air or train.

See also
 Communes of the Moselle department

References

External links
 

Communes of Moselle (department)